Peter Corbeau is a fictional character appearing in American comic books published by Marvel Comics.

Publication history

Peter Corbeau first appeared in The Incredible Hulk vol. 2 #148 and was created by Archie Goodwin and Herb Trimpe.

Fictional character biography
Peter Corbeau was a college roommate of Bruce Banner and the creator of Starcore. When the army manages to capture Hulk with tranquilizer bombs, they bring him to Dr. Peter Corbeau. Peter Corbeau uses a device that manipulates the sun's rays which neutralizes the gamma energy enough to regress Hulk back to Bruce Banner. When Jarella appears on Earth to visit Hulk, the effects it caused on Peter Corbeau's device causes the sun to become harmful. Hulk managed to thwart the danger.

Peter Corbeau later calls Colonel Jack Armbruster upon learning that he had captured Hulk and states that he has found a solution that would end Hulk. Hulk awakens upon Peter Corbeau's arrival as Peter Corbeau works with some scientists on a device that would banish Hulk into a time-space warp. It works, but it ends up freeing Juggernaut from his mystical exile. When Peter Corbeau tries to use the machine to send Juggernaut back, it malfunctions and Hulk returns where they end up fighting through the base until the X-Men arrive.

As an old friend of Professor X, Peter Corbeau rescues Professor X and some of the X-Men from the Sentinels during Christmas as Professor X mentions to him about the strange nightmares that he has been having. When Professor X has another strange nightmare, a Sentinel smashes Peter Corbeau's ship and captures Professor X. As it flies away, Peter notes that the Sentinel voices concern about solar radiation levels before realizing he has a long swim to the mainland. Peter Corbeau arrives at the X-Mansion and tells Cyclops and Nightcrawler that the Sentinels have taken their captive teammates into space. Cyclops learns that Peter Corbeau was right about the captive X-Men members being in space as Cerebro cannot find them on Earth. Under the cover of examining an approaching solar storm, Peter Corbeau uses his connections with NASA to launch a Starcore shuttle into space in order to rescue the captive X-Men. Peter manages to pilot the shuttle into the space station. The space station's owner Steven Lang informs the captive Professor X, Peter Corbeau, Cyclops, and Jean Grey that he went over the Sentinel notes and was given a funding from the Council of the Chosen to start Project: Armageddon in order to wipe out the mutant race. During Steven Lang's ranting, Cyclops frees himself from his containment and then frees the others. When the space station is about to explode, Peter Corbeau states that anyone who could pilot the crippled Starcore shuttle by a solar flare would be irradiated. Jean Grey pulls out the knowledge of flying a ship from Peter Corbeau's mind and uses her telekinesis to surround the ship as it passes by a solar flare. When the shuttle crashes into Jamaica Bay, the X-Men and Peter Corbeau swim to the surface as Jean Grey emerges as the Phoenix. After Jean Grey collapses and is in the X-Mansion's infirmary, Dr. Peter Corbeau and Jean's physician tell the X-Men that Jean Grey is going to be alright.

Peter Corbeau later talks with Jimmy Carter, the Avengers, and the Fantastic Four about a strange force that is threatening to destroy the universe.

During The Dark Phoenix Saga, Peter Corbeau learns that the threat in question is the Phoenix Force. Under the advice of Peter Corbeau, Jimmy Carter calls the Avengers only to end up finding that Edwin Jarvis is present and that the rest of the Avengers are out.

At the time when Magneto plotted to take over an island somewhere near the Bermuda Triangle, Peter Corbeau was with Professor X, Moira MacTaggert, and Carol Danvers where they witness the Blackbird going down over Julienne's Cay.

Peter Corbeau later monitors Carol Danvers's sparring with the Starjammers assessing that now she is without her Ms. Marvel powers. He does note that Carol's performance is exemplary as she ends up pinned down by Ch'od, Hepzibah, and Raza Longknife. Peter Corbeau later finishes his review of the morning workout. When Peter and Carol go to check up on Professor X's condition, Moira mentions that there is no change in his condition.

Tony Stark later meets with Peter Corbeau who believes that Stark Enterprise has won the United Nations over in order to make the company the new main contractor of Starcore.

Powers and abilities
Peter Corbeau has genius-level intellect.

Other versions

Age of Apocalypse
In the Age of Apocalypse reality, Peter Corbeau works in the library of Apocalypse. He helps Magneto transport the X-Ternals to the Shi'ar Empire using the remains of the Apocalypse's celestial ship.

Secret Wars (2015)
During the Secret Wars storyline, a variation of Peter Corbeau resides on the Battleworld domain known as the Domain of Apocalypse which is based on 51518. He is one of the human representatives of the Human Compound alongside Sheriff Carol Danvers. He and Sheriff Danvers talk with Scott Summers and Alex Summers about the Legacy Virus that the humans have in their possession. During the X-Men's attack on the Human Compound, Emma Frost read Peter Corbeau's mind where she discovered that Doctor Nemesis was the one who created the Legacy Virus.

In other media

Television
 Peter Corbeau appears in the X-Men episodes "The Phoenix Saga".
 Peter Corbeau appears in the Iron Man: Armored Adventures episode "Fun with Lasers", voiced by Alex Zahara. He is a S.H.I.E.L.D. agent stationed upon a satellite with Agent Abigail Brand when both are taken prisoner by Living Laser until they are rescued by Iron Man.
 Peter Corbeau appears in The Avengers: Earth's Mightiest Heroes episode "Operation Galactic Storm", voiced by Chris Cox. He is a S.W.O.R.D. commander in charge of the ship Falchion.

References

External links
 Peter Corbeau at Marvel Wiki
 Peter Corbeau at Comic Vine

Characters created by Archie Goodwin (comics)
Characters created by Herb Trimpe
Comics characters introduced in 1972
Marvel Comics characters
Marvel Comics scientists